Thomas G. Wynn is an American archaeologist known for his work in cognitive archaeology.   He is a pioneer of evolutionary cognitive archaeology; his article "The intelligence of later Acheulean hominids" (Man, 1979) is considered a classic in the field. He taught at the University of Colorado, Colorado Springs from 1977 to 2022, where he now hold the title Distinguished Professor Emeritus.

Education 
Wynn completed his doctorate in anthropology in 1977 at the University of Illinois, Urbana under the supervision of anthropologist Charles M. Keller. The project used Piagetian psychological theory to document cognitive evolution as represented in change in the form of stone tools; the work was ultimately published as a book, The Evolution of Spatial Competence, in 1989.

Research 
In the 1970s and 1980s, Wynn worked archaeological projects in Europe and Africa, directing the first systematic archaeological field work in the Mbeya Region of Tanzania in 1976 and 1980. To date, he has published over 150 articles, chapters, and books in Palaeolithic studies, with a particular emphasis on cognitive evolution.

With his colleague Frederick L. Coolidge, Wynn developed the Enhanced Working Memory Hypothesis (EWMH), which proposes that a small but heritable change in executive functioning may have been the reason why Homo sapiens persisted and flourished, while cousin species like the Neandertals went extinct. With his colleagues Frederick L. Coolidge and Karenleigh A. Overmann, Wynn has written about the cognitive differences between Neandertals and contemporary Homo sapiens and the implications for Neandertal extinction.

In 2011, Wynn and his colleague, psychologist Frederick L. Coolidge, established the Center for Cognitive Archaeology at the University of Colorado, Colorado Springs. In 2013, Wynn began working with LA artist Tony Berlant on an exhibition of Acheulean handaxes that celebrated their importance in the evolution of aesthetic sensibility. Entitled "First Sculpture", the exhibit was mounted at the Nasher Sculpture Center, Dallas, in 2018 and published as a volume the same year. Wynn and Berlant continued to collaborate on Mimbres painting, with an exhibition at the Los Angeles County Museum of Art and associated publication in 2018.

Honors 
In 2008, Wynn was awarded funding to organize the 139th Numbered Wenner-Gren Symposium, which was co-chaired by psychologist Frederick L. Coolidge. Entitled "Working Memory: Beyond Language and Symbolism," the proceedings were published as a special issue of Current Anthropology.

In 2014, Wynn was appointed University of Colorado Distinguished Professor in recognition of his contributions to cognitive archaeology.

Selected works

Authored books

Edited volumes

Special journal issues

Articles

Book chapters

See also

References

External links
University of Colorado, Colorado Springs Center for Cognitive Archaeology

Living people
American archaeologists
University of Illinois alumni
American cognitive scientists
University of Colorado Colorado Springs faculty
Year of birth missing (living people)